Blair Lekstrom (born 1961) is a Canadian politician, formerly a member of the Legislative Assembly of British Columbia. He represented the riding of Peace River South having been first elected in the 2001 election. Re-elected in 2005 and 2009, he did not run in the 2013 provincial election. He worked as an advisor and spokesperson for HD Mining International, Ltd. and was elected as city councillor in Dawson Creek in 2008. In February, 2020, Lekstrom resigned as councillor to take on the role of Chief Administrative Officer for the city of Dawson Creek.

Early life and education
He was born in 1961 in North Battleford, Saskatchewan and moved to Dawson Creek, British Columbia later that year. He graduated from the South Peace Secondary School, and worked with BC Tel starting in 1979 as an installer-repairman until his election in 2001.

Political career
Prior to provincial politics, he served as mayor of Dawson Creek for two terms, and was a city councillor for three years prior. Lekstrom was the president of the North Central Municipal Association for the 1999–2000 term.

He formerly served as the Minister of Energy, Mines and Petroleum Products in the government of Gordon Campbell, before resigning from the BC Liberal caucus over the Harmonized Sales Tax (HST) on June 11, 2010, a policy that Lekstrom had previously endorsed. Following the election of Christy Clark as the party's new leader in the 2011 leadership election, Lekstrom rejoined the Liberals on March 3, 2011.
Lekstrom announced in September 2012 that he would not run for office in the 2013 provincial election.

In September 2013, he was hired by HD Mining International, Ltd.

References

British Columbia Liberal Party MLAs
1961 births
Living people
Mayors of places in British Columbia
Members of the Executive Council of British Columbia
People from Dawson Creek
People from North Battleford
Independent MLAs in British Columbia
21st-century Canadian politicians
British Columbia municipal councillors